Perth Stadium, currently known as Optus Stadium for sponsorship reasons, is a multi-purpose stadium in Perth, Western Australia, located in the suburb of Burswood. It was completed in late 2017 and officially opened on 21 January 2018. The stadium's total capacity is 61,266, including standing room, making it the third-largest stadium in Australia (after the Melbourne Cricket Ground and Stadium Australia). The stadium can be extended up to 65,000 seats for rectangular sports.

Perth Stadium is primarily used for Australian rules football and cricket. Perth's two Australian Football League (AFL) teams – the Fremantle Football Club and the West Coast Eagles – relocated their home games from Subiaco Oval to Perth Stadium, while the Perth Scorchers play their Big Bash League home games at the venue, having previously played at the WACA Ground.

Perth Stadium was built by a consortium led by Multiplex. The announcement of the Burswood location in June 2011 followed a series of earlier proposals for the stadium, including locations in Subiaco and East Perth.

Perth Stadium was awarded the 2019 World Prix Versailles award in the Sports category. This is the World Architecture and Design Award.

History

Early proposals

In 2003, the Government of Western Australia commissioned a review to examine the future of major sporting venues in Western Australia. To conduct the review, a taskforce was appointed. It was chaired by John Langoulant, Chief Executive of the Chamber of Commerce and Industry of Western Australia, and released its final report in May 2007. The report recommended the construction of a new 60,000-seat stadium at either Kitchener Park (which adjoins Subiaco Oval) or in East Perth, which would be suitable for Australian rules football, cricket and also rectangular-field sports such as soccer, rugby union and rugby league. The taskforce recommended against the further development of Subiaco Oval, which would be demolished. It also recommended against building the new stadium at the site of Burswood, stating that "The development costs at the Burswood site would be significantly higher due to local site conditions and the need for significant upgrades to transport infrastructure."

In July 2007, the Government of Western Australia announced its preference to build a new 60,000-seat stadium rather than re-develop Subiaco Oval, and in early 2008 it confirmed that Subiaco Oval would be demolished for the new Perth super-stadium to be built next door at Kitchener Park. This site was chosen ahead of the other suggested site at the old East Perth Power Station, which was set aside to house a new $500 million museum.

The new stadium at Subiaco was scheduled to be built between 2011 and 2016, with the majority of the stadium to be completed in 2014. Subiaco Oval was to be demolished between 2014 and 2016 to allow the end of construction on Perth Stadium. The staged construction would have allowed for Australian rules football to be played at the new venue by 2014, when the stadium was two-thirds completed with an initial capacity of 40,000 seats. The final stage would be completed in 2016 and expand the stadium's capacity to 60,000.

Stadium plans suggested its playing surface would have been oval in shape to accommodate Australian rules football and cricket games. The stadium was also expected to have retractable seating which would have reconfigured the venue to make it suitable for rectangular-field sports codes, such as soccer, rugby union and rugby league. These retractable seats were to number 22,000, and were to be situated along the touch lines and behind the posts in the rectangular configuration. With an overall planned capacity of 60,000, Perth Stadium would have been Western Australia's largest sports venue, and it was designed to be built such that the capacity could be increased to 70,000 if needed in the future.

The stadium was expected to be primarily used for Australian rules football with the ability to host cricket, rugby union, rugby league and soccer matches. It was planned that it would be the home ground for the West Coast Eagles and Fremantle Dockers, the two Western Australian teams in the Australian Football League. It was also planned to host rugby union Test matches, soccer and rock concerts. In reality AFL matches have been joined by the AFLW games and WAFL grand finals.

The cost for the Kitchener Park stadium was expected to reach $1.1 billion, including $800 million on construction of the stadium itself and $300 million on associated infrastructure, property acquisition, escalation, transport infrastructure and other costs. Construction of the new stadium would have involved moving 27 private residences and moving residents from another 66 state housing properties surrounding Subiaco Oval. These state housing tenants would have been relocated within the Subiaco area. The project was going to be funded by the Government of Western Australia.

Following the election of a new State Government under Colin Barnett, the new stadium's plans were scrapped in early February 2009.  Barnett stated that a new stadium would not be considered for at least two years. As a result of Australia's failed bid for the 2022 World Cup, $250 million in potential Federal Government funding for a new stadium was also withdrawn in December 2010.

Burswood location
In June 2011, the State Government announced that the new stadium would be built in Burswood on the northern section of the Burswood Park golf course. The government stated that the Burswood site was preferred because it was unconstrained by surrounding developments and had the additional benefit of being government-owned. It would also allow for a special events six-platform Perth Stadium railway station to be built and could be connected to the central business district via a pedestrian bridge across the Swan River to East Perth. A car park was not built to service the stadium, with visitors expected to either park in the city and walk across the bridge or use public transport.

The Government stated that planning for the new stadium at Burswood was due to be completed by mid-2012, with construction commencing in 2014 and scheduled for completion in 2018. It announced Multiplex as the contract holders for the construction of the stadium and appointed the firm Populous as the project's architectural consultants.

Construction

Cost

Following the Barnett Government's announcement to move the site of the proposed stadium to Burswood, it stated that the stadium would cost around $700 million, with an extra $300 million allocated to public transport works. However, in December 2011 Premier Colin Barnett stated that it was too early to say what the final cost would be, explaining that "No one can put a price on it until it's designed, until it goes out to tender".

The previous Government's Major Stadia Taskforce had earlier put the total cost of the Burswood stadium option, including transport needs, at $1.147 billion. This higher cost, comparative to the sites at Subiaco or East Perth, was mainly "due to the need to provide substantial transport infrastructure as well as the additional costs associated with site conditions (i.e. reclaimed flood plain and site previously used as the Perth Municipal Rubbish Dump which included industrial as well as domestic landfill up until 1971)." In June 2011 the West Australian newspaper reported that due to an increase in construction costs since the release of the task force report in 2007, the total cost will be close to $1.5 billion, assuming work begins within two years.

The Australian Football League agreed to help pay for Perth's new stadium at Burswood, although it was not revealed how much money it would contribute. However, the nearby Crown Perth, which is expected to benefit commercially from the presence of the stadium, was not asked by the Barnett Government to help meet the construction costs.

In October 2017 it was reported that the final cost of the completed stadium was $1.6 billion. This equated to an average cost per Western Australian household of $1500, and per person of $600. In February 2018 a State Government inquiry into Western Australia's finances under the former Barnett government found that the full cost of the stadium including transport infrastructure will be $1.8 billion, around $200 million more than previous estimates.

Impacts

The site is located on the Burswood Peninsula, previously known as the Swan Portland Cement Site. The Swan Portland Cement Company Ltd operated at the site from 1927 and James Hardie Industries operated at the adjacent site from the 1920s up until 1981. In its report and recommendations, Remediation and Redevelopment of the Swan Portland Cement Site, Burswood, (January 1998) the Environmental Protection Authority, states "The current site is contaminated with asbestos waste from the James Hardie operations and cement kiln dust, kiln bricks and associated contaminated soil and hydrocarbons from the Swan Portland cement operations." In its report it estimates  cement kiln dust on the site, the effects of which should be managed, with regard to its effects upon public health, groundwater and surface water.

The EPA report states that while undisturbed in the soil, the contamination poses no threat to public health but disturbing the site will result in airborne asbestos fibres and contamination from the soil. The EPA recommended a management plan for any disturbance of asbestos contamination to be conducted by the Town of Victoria Park.

In November 2012, Victoria Park residents contacted the Health Department to notify them asbestos and other material had been unearthed by work on the southern parking lot of the Casino complex. Alarmed residents feared asbestos exposure to locals, park users and Casino patrons. Although the Health Department advised that no risk had been identified, stock piles were sprayed with hydromulch, windbreaks were put on fencing, contaminant levels were being monitored and paths and loose soil were sealed. The Premier's office advised that the Department of Building Management and Works were undertaking the project. The Health Department assured residents there was "no risk to the general public".

The construction of the stadium affected Aboriginal communities. Although the State Solicitor's Office advises that native title has been extinguished over the site, it has heritage significance for the local indigenous people, the Whadjuk Noongar, being a burial site. Despite the Department of Indigenous Affairs advising the existence of the registered Aboriginal Heritage site affecting the Burswood Peninsula and East Perth foreshore, the site was deregistered by the Barnett Liberal State Government. Following the Supreme Court decision Robinson v Fielding [2015] WASC 108 to reinstate DAA 22874 (Marapikurrinya Yintha – Port Hedland Harbour) after it had been deregistered by the Barnett government, the Burswood Island Burial site was reassessed in October 2016 but remains "Not a Site" under the Aboriginal Heritage Act (AHA). Previously the site was recognised by the Department of Aboriginal Affairs under the Aboriginal Heritage Act 1972 (AHA) as DAA site 15914: Burswood Island Burial. "Several culturally significant sites around WA have had their protection withdrawn in the past year on the basis they no longer fit the definition of a sacred site. Guidelines issued by the Department of Aboriginal Affairs stated that to be a recognised as sacred site, a place needs to have been devoted to religious use rather than simply mythological stories, songs or beliefs."

Opening
The first event to be held at the stadium was a Twenty20 cricket match between the Perth Scorchers and the England Lions on 11 December 2017, followed by a second match between the same teams two days later. It was officially opened to the public on 21 January 2018 with a free open day for the community.

Naming rights

During construction, then-Premier Colin Barnett had maintained that the government would not be selling the naming rights for the stadium as it would "not be appropriate for such a significant piece of State-owned infrastructure". Instead he suggested a name such as "Swan Stadium" or "River Stadium" – named after the adjacent Swan River – would be more appropriate. Ultimately, the name Perth Stadium was settled on as it was more representative of Western Australia. In the lead up to the state election in March 2017, Labor, then in opposition, announced that it would sell the naming rights for both Perth Stadium and Perth Arena as part of a plan to return the state budget to surplus if it were to win government.

Despite initially suggesting it might retain the Perth Stadium name or at least retain "Perth" in any naming rights arrangement, the new McGowan government announced on 8 November 2017 that the stadium would be officially known as Optus Stadium. Optus, the second-largest telecommunication company in Australia, and the state government agreed to a 10-year naming rights deal that is thought to be worth approximately $50 million in value.

For international cricket matches, the stadium is known as Perth Stadium, due to Cricket Australia’s contractual obligations.

Facilities

Architecture and design

As with the earlier plans for the new stadium at Kitchener Park, the stadium seats over 60,000 spectators, with the ability to seat up to 70,000 in rectangular mode. Initially in the early design stages, it was hoped the venue could have the potential to expand to 80,000 seats in the future by adding a third tier along one wing and another tier on the opposite side of the ground each holding 10,000 seats. Even at 61,266, Perth Stadium still has the third-biggest capacity of any stadium in the country.

It is a multi-purpose facility able to hold not only sporting events such as Australian rules football and major rugby league, rugby union, cricket and soccer games, but major cultural events such as concerts.

Like WACA, when the Fremantle sea breeze blows across the stadium, it give welcoming relief from the heat. However, due to the stadium seating being a fully enclosed, open roofed dome, the stadium can get hotter than the WACA.

Food and amenities
The stadium is serviced by over 50 food and beverage outlets, with patrons able to follow on-field action on TV screens. The Camfield, a large pub, microbrewery and function centre, is located outside the stadium and open seven days a week.

There are two  screens on either end of the stadium and over 1,000 TV screens located within it. The stadium has 748 male, 781 female and 60 accessible toilets. Security features include an on-site police station, 650 CCTV cameras around the stadium and surrounding precinct, and freestanding metal detectors at the stadium.

During the Test Cricket match in December 2019, a temporary swimming pool was installed, similar to the one at The Gabba.

In February 2021 a rooftop tour branded "Halo" was opened at the stadium, allowing participants to walk around the stadium's roof. In August 2021 a new viewing platform began construction on top of the roof on the western side of the stadium. The wheelchair accessible platform, which resembles a pull tab from above, projects  beyond both sides of the stadium roof and also features a section where visitors can lean over the playing field below while wearing a safety harness. The platform and the attraction - branded "Vertigo" - both opened in March 2022.

Transport

As the stadium is located on a peninsula with limited road access, the majority of visitors have to travel to and from the stadium primarily by public transport. The Public Transport Authority aims to have 83 percent of visitors use public transport. The six-platform Perth Stadium railway station and 22-stand Perth Stadium Bus Station located nearby are expected to serve an estimated 28,000 and 8,000 passengers respectively on event days.

For events, 8,600 people typically walk and cycle across the Swan River via the Windan Bridge, and an additional 14,300 walk across the Matagarup Bridge which connects the stadium precinct with public transport and car parks in East Perth. There are 600 bicycle parking spots located around the stadium precinct. The stadium has 1,400 car parking bays, but they are reserved for staff, premium ticket holders and disability parking. A taxi rank is next to the stadium.

A  jetty was built near Matagarup Bridge and officially opened on 11 June 2018. The Burswood Jetty allows all public and commercial vessels to drop off or pick up patrons with a 15-minute time limit. The Little Ferry Co. operate a service which stops daily at the jetty, while Captain Cook Cruises operate cruise transfers to and from the jetty on event days.

Stadium uses

Australian rules football

Perth Stadium is used for Australian rules football matches in the Australian Football League (AFL) from March–September. The stadium was constructed to provide a new home ground for the West Coast Eagles and Fremantle, Perth's two professional AFL clubs. The state government negotiated an agreement with the AFL and the West Australian Football Commission (WAFC) in October 2017, allowing the Eagles and Dockers to play their home matches at the venue from the start of the 2018 season, in exchange for a $10.3 million a year guarantee for the WAFC until 2028. Fremantle's women's team hosted the first Australian rules football match at the venue against  on 10 February 2018, and the attendance of 41,975 was the highest stand-alone figure in domestic women's sport.

Perth Stadium became the twelfth venue to host a VFL/AFL Grand Final when, due to the COVID-19 lockdown in Victoria precluding travel from the state, it hosted the 2021 AFL Grand Final. A total of 61,118 people attended, which is the second highest crowd for the stadium and the biggest for an AFL game at the venue.

Cricket
Cricket matches, such as One Day Internationals (ODI) and Twenty20s, are held at the stadium in the months of October–February. Since late 2017, the Australia national cricket team play most of their Perth-based Tests, One Day and Twenty20 matches at the venue. The stadium is also the home ground of Big Bash League side Perth Scorchers, who relocated from the WACA Ground in 2018. The first major event at the stadium was an ODI match between Australia and England on 28 January 2018, which England won by 12 runs.

Perth Stadium became the 19th venue in Australia to host a One Day International cricket game. The Western Australian Cricket Association later confirmed that the stadium would host its first ever Test match, which began between Australia and India on 14 December 2018.

Perth Stadium became the fourth venue in Australia to host a men's Day/night cricket Test match, when Australia took on New Zealand between 12 and 16 December 2019.

With Australia hosting the 2022 edition of the Men's T20 World Cup, Perth Stadium will be hosting five out of the 45 matches being played around the country, all taking place in October.

Rugby league

The National Rugby League played a double-header in round 1 of the 2018 NRL season in front of 38,842 fans.

The second match of the 2019 State of Origin series between New South Wales and Queensland was played here on 23 June 2019 and marked the first Origin game to be played in Western Australia. New South Wales defeated Queensland 38–6 in front of a crowd of 59,721 spectators.

On 21 April 2021, it was announced that the second match of the 2022 State of Origin series will be held at Optus Stadium after managing to secure the event from the Australian Rugby League Commission for an undisclosed sum.

Rugby union
The Australian game in the 2019 Bledisloe Cup series, which doubled as a Rugby Championship match, was played at the stadium between Australia and New Zealand on 10 August 2019. The match was the first Bledisloe Cup Test to be held in Western Australia (Subiaco Oval had previously hosted Mandela Challenge Plate Tests in the Tri-Nations against South Africa) and set the stadium's current highest single-day attendance rate until February 2020.

On 30 January 2020, the Western Australian state government announced that the Springboks will play the Wallabies at the stadium as part of the 2020 Rugby Championship on 29 August 2020. This was however cancelled due to the COVID-19 pandemic. Additionally, following the success of the match in 2019, it was announced that the Australian game of the Bledisloe Cup will return to the stadium in 2021.

In July 2022, the Wallabies hosted historic rival, England, in a three-test series; the first match was played at Optus Stadium.

Soccer

The stadium hosted a friendly match between Perth Glory and Chelsea on 23 July 2018.

The 2019 A-League Grand Final was played at the stadium on 19 May 2019, which was the first time Perth Glory has hosted the grand final in the League's history. The Grand Final broke the attendance record for an A-League finals series match. Manchester United played two pre-season games at the stadium, one against Perth Glory on 13 July 2019 and the other against historic rival Leeds United on 17 July 2019.

In July 2022, English Premier League clubs Manchester United, Aston Villa, Leeds United, and Crystal Palace will travel to Perth to compete in ICON - Perth's Festival of International Football. Crystal Palace plays Leeds United on 22 July, and Manchester United will play Aston Villa on 23 July.

Entertainment
Perth Stadium is also capable of hosting major concerts and other entertainment events. Both Ed Sheeran and Taylor Swift performed at the venue in 2018. Nitro Circus performed at the stadium on 22 April 2018. Eminem performed at the Stadium on 27 February 2019. U2 performed at the Stadium on 27 November 2019 as part of their 2019 Joshua Tree tour. Queen + Adam Lambert performed at the Stadium on 23 February 2020 as part of their Rhapsody Tour. On 18 November 2022, Guns N' Roses performed at the stadium as part of their 2022 tour. On 12 February 2023, the Red Hot Chili Peppers and Post Malone performed at the stadium as part of the former act's Global Stadium Tour. Ed Sheeran performed again at the stadium on 12 March 2023 as part of his +–=÷x Tour. On 1 and 2 March 2024, Pink will perform at the stadium as part of her Summer Carnival tour.

Attendances

Sports

Other events

Overall attendance records

See also
List of Australian Football League grounds
List of A-League stadiums

Notes

References

External links

Official website

Australian Football League grounds
Test cricket grounds in Australia
Burswood, Western Australia
Fremantle Football Club
Cricket grounds in Western Australia
Rugby league stadiums in Australia
Rugby union stadiums in Australia
Sports venues completed in 2017
Soccer venues in Perth, Western Australia
West Coast Eagles
2017 establishments in Australia
Multi-purpose stadiums in Australia
AFL Women's grounds